Chowkbazar, also called Chawkbazar Model Thana, is a Thana of Dhaka District in the Division of Dhaka, Bangladesh. It was formed in August 2009 from parts of Lalbagh Thana and Kotwali Thana, and has an area of 2.07 km2. It includes the Chowk Bazaar and was the site of the February 2019 Dhaka fire.

See also
Upazilas of Bangladesh
Districts of Bangladesh
Divisions of Bangladesh

References

Old Dhaka
Thanas of Dhaka